Cortesi may refer to:

People
 Celeste Cortesi, model from Philippine who won Miss Earth 2018
 Antonio Cortesi (1796 – 1879), Italian ballet dancer, choreographer, and composer
 Chiara Simoneschi-Cortesi (born 1946), Italian politician and member of the Christian Democratic People's Party
 Fabrizio Cortesi (1879-1949), Italian botanist
 Filippo Cortesi, Roman Catholic Apostolic Nuncio to Poland from December 24, 1936 to February 1, 1947
 Giovanna Cortesi Marmocchini (1666-1731), Italian artist
 Ilario Cortesi, C.R. (1545–1608), Italian Roman Catholic Bishop of Policastro
 Natascia Leonardi Cortesi (born 1971), Swiss cross-country skier and ski mountaineer
 Tiberio Cortesi (died 1602), Italian Roman Catholic Bishop of Lavello

Other
 91428 Cortesi

See also
 Cortese, a surname
 Corydoras cortesi, a tropical freshwater fish belonging to the subfamily Corydoradinae of the family Callichthyidae found in Colombia
 San Giacomo e Filippo, Corte de' Cortesi, Roman Catholic church in Neoclassical-style, located in the province of Cremona